"Ring" is a song recorded by American rapper Cardi B for her debut studio album Invasion of Privacy (2018). It featuring vocals from American singer Kehlani. It was written by the two said artists, Desmond Dennis, Jordan Thorpe, DeMario Bridges and Nija Charles, along with its producers Needlz and Scribz Riley. It debuted at number 28 on the US Billboard Hot 100 the week following the album's release, marking Kehlani's highest-charting song so far. It was serviced to rhythmic and urban contemporary radio on August 28, 2018, as the album's fifth and final single.

Composition and lyrics
Described as a "smooth R&B jam" by an AllMusic editor, "Ring" shows the protagonist in a vulnerable situation, as it features themes of heartbreak and jealousy. In the lyrics, Cardi expresses frustration at a significant other that stopped contacting her, while holding onto her pride. A writer for The Guardian interpreted the lyrics as exploring "the contemporary romantic paranoia that comes from smartphones."

Music video
Cardi announced the release of the music video in late July for the next month. Directed by Mike Ho and released on August 20, 2018, the video finds the rapper in tangled telephone wires, and both artists performing their respective verses inside phone booths and in stark gray rooms while wearing black and silver ensembles. As of December 2018, it has received over 100 million views on YouTube.

Chart performance
In the United States, "Ring" debuted at number 28 on the Billboard Hot 100 the week following the album's release. This gives Kehlani her first top 40 hit and highest peaking song to date. With the release of the music video, it re-entered the Hot 100 on the chart issue dated September 1, 2018 for a fifth charting week, and returned to the top 40 in its 15th charting week.

Awards and nominations

Charts

Weekly charts

Year-end charts

Certifications

Release history

References

External links

2018 songs
2018 singles
Atlantic Records singles
Cardi B songs
Kehlani songs
Song recordings produced by Needlz
Songs written by Cardi B
Songs written by Kehlani
Songs written by Pardison Fontaine
Songs written by Nija Charles
Songs about heartache